Gather, gatherer, or gathering may refer to:

Anthropology and sociology
Hunter-gatherer, a person or a society whose subsistence depends on hunting and gathering of wild foods
Intensive gathering, the practice of cultivating wild plants as a step toward domestication
Harvesting crops

Craftwork
Gather (sewing), an area where fabric is folded or bunched together with thread or yarn
Gather (knitting), a generic term for one of several knitting techniques to draw stitches closer together
Gathering (bookbinding), a number of sheets of paper folded and sewn or glued as a group into a bookbinding

Gathering
Gathering, any type of party or meeting, including:
Bee (gathering), an old term which describes a group of people coming together for a task
Salon (gathering), a party associated with French and Italian intellectuals
Global gathering, a music festival in the United Kingdom
Rainbow Gathering
Ricochet Gathering, a music event in the United States
Tribal Gathering, a music festival in the United Kingdom
Gathering (album), an album by Josh Ritter
Gathering (animation studio), Japanese animation studio
Gathering (LDS Church), a doctrine of the Latter Day Saints

Other
Gather (film), a 2020 documentary film about Native American foodways
Gathering of Developers, sometimes called as 'Gathering'
Rag gatherer, an archaic occupation, also known as rag picker
Gather.com, a  social networking website
"Gather", song from All the Light Above It Too

See also 
 Gathers, surname
 The Gathering (disambiguation)
 Meeting